The AND gate is a basic digital logic gate that implements logical conjunction (∧) from mathematical logic AND gate behaves according to the truth table. A HIGH output (1) results only if all the inputs to the AND gate are HIGH (1). If not all inputs to the AND gate are  HIGH, LOW output results. The function can be extended to any number of inputs.

Symbols

There are three symbols for AND gates: the American (ANSI or 'military') symbol and the IEC ('European' or 'rectangular') symbol, as well as the deprecated DIN symbol. Additional inputs can be added as needed. For more information see Logic gate symbols article. It can also be denoted as symbol "^" or "&".

The AND gate with inputs A and B and output C implements the logical expression .

Implementations

An AND gate can be designed using only N-channel (pictured) or P-channel MOSFETs, but is usually implemented with both (CMOS). The digital inputs a and b cause the output F to have the same result as the AND function. AND gates may be made from discrete components and are readily available as integrated circuits in several different logic families.

Analytical representation 
 is the analytical representation of AND gate:

Alternatives 

If no specific AND gates are available, one can be made from NAND or NOR gates, because NAND and NOR gates are "universal gates"  meaning that they can be used to make all the others.

See also 

OR gate
NOT gate
NAND gate
NOR gate
XOR gate
XNOR gate
IMPLY gate
Boolean algebra
Logic gate

References 

Logic gates